The 1928 Eastern Illinois Blue and Gray football team represented Eastern Illinois State Teachers  College (now known as Eastern Illinois University) as a member of the Illinois Intercollegiate Athletic Conference (IIAC) during the 1928 college football season. The team was led by seventeenth-year head coach Charles Lantz and played its home games at Schahrer Field.

Schedule

References

Eastern Illinois
Eastern Illinois Panthers football seasons
Interstate Intercollegiate Athletic Conference football champion seasons
Eastern Illinois Blue and Gray football
College football undefeated seasons